Encainide (trade name Enkaid) is a class Ic antiarrhythmic agent. It is no longer used because of its frequent proarrhythmic side effects.

Synthesis

See also 
Iferanserin
 Cardiac Arrhythmia Suppression Trial

References 

Antiarrhythmic agents
Benzanilides
Phenol ethers
Piperidines
Sodium channel blockers
Withdrawn drugs